Pityocona attenuata is a moth in the family Gelechiidae. It was described by John Frederick Gates Clarke in 1986. It is found on the Marquesas Archipelago in French Polynesia.

References

Pityocona
Moths described in 1986